The Order of Public Instruction is a Portuguese order of civil merit. Established in 1927, it is conferred upon deserving individuals for "high services rendered to education and teaching."

The following is a list of recipients of the order's highest grade, Grand Cross.

Source for the list: "Entidades Nacionais Agraciadas com Ordens Portuguesas", Ordens Honoríficas Portuguesas (Office of the President of Portugal). Retrieved 19 February 2019.

Portuguese recipients

References 

Orders, decorations, and medals of Portugal